The 1994–95 Asian Club Championship was the 14th edition of the annual international club football competition held in the AFC region (Asia). It determined that year's club champion of association football in Asia.

Thai Farmers Bank FC from Thailand crowned Asian champion for the second consecutive year.

Preliminary round

Central Asia

South Asia

 Pakistan did not send a team.

South-East Asia

All matches were played in Bandar Seri Begawan, Brunei, from 26 to 30 August 1994.

First round

West Asia

|}

Note: the Jordanian FA did not send a team, while  Al-Ahli withdrew before the draw.

East Asia

|}

Second round

West Asia

|}

East Asia

|}
1 The AFC ordered that the 2nd leg was to be played in Malaysia due to a plague pandemic in India, but Mohun Bagan objected to the ruling and refused to travel; they were ejected from the competition, fined $3000 and banned from AFC competitions for three years.

Quarterfinals

West Asia

All matches were played in Doha, Qatar.

East Asia

All matches were played at Changwon Sports Park in Changwon, South Korea.

Semifinals

Third place match

Final

References

Asian Club Competitions 1994/95 at RSSSF.com

1994 in Asian football
1995 in Asian football
1994-95